Niels Ellwanger (born 5 December 1965) is a West German sprint canoer who competed in the late 1980s. At the 1988 Summer Olympics in Seoul, he finished fourth in the K-2 1000 m event.

References
Sports-Reference.com profile

External links

1965 births
Canoeists at the 1988 Summer Olympics
German male canoeists
Living people
Olympic canoeists of West Germany
Place of birth missing (living people)